Aidan Gallagher (born September 18, 2003) is an American actor and musician. His first major role was portraying one of the quadruplets, Nicky Harper, in the Nickelodeon comedy television series Nicky, Ricky, Dicky & Dawn.

In 2019, Gallagher began portraying Number Five in the Netflix series The Umbrella Academy, which is his breakthrough role and has brought him widespread recognition.

Career

Acting
Gallagher first appeared in a minor role in a 2013 episode of Modern Family. He was in the short film You & Me and was in the CBS television pilot Jacked Up, which was not picked up and never aired. He then landed a major role in Nickelodeon's Nicky, Ricky, Dicky & Dawn as Nicky Harper, for which he was nominated Favorite Male TV Star in the Nickelodeon Kids' Choice Awards in 2016 and 2017. He was in the show for four seasons until it ended in 2018.

In February 2019, Gallagher began starring in the Netflix superhero series The Umbrella Academy, an adaptation of the comic book series of the same name, as Number Five / The Boy, a 58-year-old time traveller who's stuck inside the body of his 13-year-old self due to an accidental time jump. His portrayal won him critical praise; as The New York Times''' reviewer put it, he "carries the show as far as he can". Daniel Fienberg of The Hollywood Reporter wrote that "Gallagher is very good in the tricky part of a fifty-something-year-old man trapped in the body of a schoolboy".

Music
Aside from acting, Gallagher is also a singer and songwriter. He began releasing songs independently in 2018 starting with "Blue Neon" through his YouTube channel. The following year, he collaborated with The Voice contestant Trinity Rose on a duet track "Miss You". He released two more singles, "Time" and "For You" in that same year. On January 5, 2020 Gallagher embarked on his first headlining tour, the "Blue Neon Tour" and was scheduled to perform at South by Southwest, but was later cancelled due to the COVID-19 pandemic. Later that year, he released two singles: "I Love You" on March 20 and "4th of July" on July 4, the latter of which he started working on while filming the second season of The Umbrella Academy.

Personal life
Gallagher is active on environmental issues, and has served as a youth advocate for a number of environmental organizations, including Waterkeeper Alliance, WildAid and Oceanic Preservation Society. In 2018, he was listed 
in Variety's Hollywood Youth Impact Report, and was appointed as a UN Environment Goodwill Ambassador for North America, one of the youngest ever UN Goodwill Ambassador to be so-named. In the year 2021, he gave an interview for the fashion magazine Vanity Teen'', reviewing his career and his social influence on youth.

Gallagher is a vegan. He is Jewish.

Filmography

Film

Television

Music videos

Discography

Awards and nominations

References

External links 
 

2003 births
Living people
21st-century American male actors
21st-century American singers
American environmentalists
American male child actors
American male television actors
Jewish American male actors
21st-century American Jews